Channel Nordica is a collaboration album by Waltari+Angelit. It is the ninth studio album by Waltari.

Track listing

 "Intro" - 1:02
 "Tráveller" - 4:52
 "System Oðða Áigi" - 4:57
 "Muittut" - 2:51
 "Virtual Áigái" - 5:29
 "So Fine 2000" - 3:57
 "Hard And Positive" - 4:27
 "Ii Dohko Guvluige" - 2:21
 "Ballad (To The Glory Of Your Nature)" - 7:54
 "Jänkhä" - 5:01
 "Come On Come On" - 3:39
 "Stay Positive" - 4:46
 "Messengers (The Time Has Come)" - 5:33
 "Sámi Eatnan" - 5:07

Personnel

Waltari

Kärtsy Hatakka - Vocals, bass, programming
Roope Latvala - Guitar
Jariot Lehtinen - Guitar
Janne Parviainen - Drums

Angelit

Tuuni Länsman - vocals
Ursula Länsman - vocals
Alfred Häkkinen - guitar, drums
Samuli Kosminen - percussion
Mamba Assefa - percussion
Kimmo Kajasto - keyboards, programming, atmospherics

External links
Encyclopaedia Metallum page

Waltari albums
Angelit albums
2000 albums